"Tar" is the debut single by the British pop group Visage, released in 1979.

Background
"Tar" was the band's sole release on Radar Records in November 1979, before they signed to Polydor Records the following year. The song's lyrics are centred on the habit of smoking cigarettes. As Steve Strange put it in his autobiography, the song is about "the pleasure and pain of nicotine". The B-side to the single is "Frequency 7", a rapid synthesizer composition with vocoder vocals. (An extended, instrumental "Dance Mix" of the song was released on the "Mind of a Toy" single in 1981. Both versions were re-released by the band in 2013).

"Tar" was not a chart hit, and Radar's distribution deal collapsed shortly after the single was released. A newer version of the song appeared on Visage's eponymous debut album released in 1980. The "Tar" single is the only Visage release featuring bassist Barry Adamson as a member of the band, receiving composing credits for both songs. He played a smaller role as a session musician in all subsequent releases. No music video was produced for the track.

Track listing
 7" single (1979)
A. "Tar" –  3:27
B. "Frequency 7" – 3:05

Personnel
Steve Strange — vocals
Midge Ure — synthesizer, backing vocals
Billy Currie — synthesizer
John McGeoch — saxophone
Rusty Egan — drums, electronic drums programming
Barry Adamson — bass
Dave Formula — synthesizer
Peter Ashworth – sleeve photography

References

1979 debut singles
1979 songs
Radar Records singles
Songs written by Midge Ure
Visage (band) songs
Songs written by Billy Currie
Songs written by Steve Strange
Songs written by Rusty Egan
Songs written by Dave Formula
Songs written by John McGeoch